Coleorozena pilatei is a species of case-bearing leaf beetle in the family Chrysomelidae. It is found in Central America and North America.

Subspecies
These three subspecies belong to the species Coleorozena pilatei:
 Coleorozena pilatei californiensis (Moldenke, 1970)
 Coleorozena pilatei pilatei (Lacordaire, 1848)
 Coleorozena pilatei subtilis (Horn, 1892)

References

Further reading

 

Clytrini
Articles created by Qbugbot
Beetles described in 1848